Gadiyara is a 2020 Indian Kannada-language thriller film directed by Prabhik Mogaveer. The film featured Raj Deepak Shetty, Sheethal Shetty, Sharath Lohitashwa and Suchendra Prasad as lead characters. The music is composed by Raghav Subhash.

Plot 
Professor (Sharath Lohitashwa) who conspiracy to steal treasures hidden in various places during the time of the[kings. Police officer (Raj Deepak Shetty) chasing the case. Students who become police guests unconsciously. A professor is arrested by a police officer over a report by a journalist (Sheetal Shetty) that the students in the custody. However, the core of the report is not left to the directors alone.

Cast 

 Raj Deepak Shetty
 Sheethal Shetty
 Yash Shetty
 Sharath Lohitashwa
 Suchendra Prasad
 Sangliana
 Mandeep Rai
 Ganesh Rao
 Pranaya Murthy
 Radha Ramachandra

References 

2020 films
2020s Kannada-language films